Henry Madison "Hank" Rowan Jr. (December 4, 1923 – December 9, 2015) was an American engineer and philanthropist. Rowan University was named for him, after he made a $100-million donation.

He was born in Raphine, Virginia, to Henry M. Rowan Sr. and Margaret Frances Boyd Rowan on December 4, 1923 (coincidentally the same year the school which now carries his name was founded). He grew up in Ridgewood, New Jersey and, after serving as a bomber pilot in World War II with the United States Army Air Forces, Rowan attended Williams College and graduated from Massachusetts Institute of Technology with honors with a degree in electrical engineering.

Rowan originally worked for Ajax Electrothermic Corporation of Trenton, New Jersey.  He suggested improvements to the furnaces made by Ajax—shorter power leads and heavier copper bus bar—but the company did not implement his suggestions. Rowan left Ajax and decided to start his own company, Inductotherm Corp. Rowan designed and built his first induction furnace in 1953 in the garage of his home in Ewing Township, New Jersey with the help of his wife. Expanding from this first induction furnace Rowan created Inductotherm Industries Inc. which has since grown to include more than 40 subsidiaries throughout North America, South America, Europe, India, Asia and Australia.  Today, there are more than 27,000 Inductotherm induction melting installations worldwide and they account for more than half of the melting systems in the world today.

Philanthropy
In spring 1992, Rowan and his wife Betty pledged $100 million to Glassboro State College, which was renamed Rowan University the same year in his honor.  At the time, it was the largest gift to a public college in the history of higher education.  The school now has an engineering building named after him.

Rowan and his wife were strong supporters of Doane Academy in Burlington, NJ. In January 2015 they created the Henry M. and Eleanor E. Rowan Endowment. This endowment was created with a gift of $17 million. The Rowans, personally and through their family foundation, have donated over $30 million to Doane Academy over the last several years.

Personal
Rowan competed in the 1992 Olympic Sailing trials in Miami, but failed to qualify.  He wrote an autobiography titled The Fire Within in 1995 with John Calhoun Smith.

He lived in Westampton Township, New Jersey for part of his life.

On December 9, 2015, Rowan died at the age of 92.

References

Rowan Magazine

External links
 Remembering Henry Rowan
 Henry Rowan featured in Rowan Magazine
 Inductotherm Corp.
 Malcolm Gladwell podcast - "My Little Hundred Million" 

1923 births
2015 deaths
Engineers from Virginia
United States Army Air Forces bomber pilots of World War II
MIT School of Engineering alumni
People from Ewing Township, New Jersey
People from Ridgewood, New Jersey
People from Westampton Township, New Jersey
Rowan University
People from Rockbridge County, Virginia
Engineers from New Jersey
20th-century American philanthropists
Military personnel from New Jersey